The 18th TCA Awards were presented by the Television Critics Association. Bob Newhart hosted the ceremony on July 20, 2002, at the Ritz-Carlton Huntington Hotel and Spa in Pasadena, California.

Winners and nominees

Multiple wins 
The following shows received multiple wins:

Multiple nominations 
The following shows received multiple nominations:

References

External links 
 Official website 
 2002 TCA Awards at IMDb.com

2002 television awards
2002 in American television
TCA Awards ceremonies